The Lochaber hydroelectric scheme is a hydroelectric power generation project constructed in the Lochaber area of the western Scottish Highlands after the First World War. Like its predecessor at Kinlochleven, it was intended to provide electricity for aluminium production, this time at Fort William, a little further north. It is still in operation.

Construction

The scheme was initially designed by engineer Charles Meik but after his death in 1923, the scheme’s realisation was left to William Halcrow, by then a partner in the firm founded by Meik’s father Thomas Meik.

The project was finally sanctioned by Parliament in 1921, but construction did not start until 1924.
On 30 December 1929, the first aluminium was cast. It eventually became part of British Aluminium.

The scheme harnessed the headwaters of the Rivers Treig and Spean and the floodwaters of the River Spey (plus a further eleven burns along the way). A  tunnel then linked this body of water with another reservoir (Loch Treig) contained by the Treig dam. From the western mountainside, down five massive steel penstocks, the water was channelled  to the turbines in the power house at the smelting plant.

Present operation
Following the closure of Rio Tinto/Alcan's other UK smelters at Invergordon (1981), Kinlochleven (2000), Anglesey (2009) and Lynemouth (2012) the hydro-electric scheme and smelter at Fort William was operated by Rio Tinto Alcan. Under threat of closure the smelter was put up for sale in 2016. GFG Alliance, which incorporates SIMEC and the Liberty House Group, as the successful bidder, bought the Lochaber Smelter for £330m. It has plans to expand the factory and produce car parts.

On 3 April 2021, it came to light that the Jahama Highland Estates (formerly the "Alcan Estate") had been purchased in 2016 as part of the Rio Tinto Mines deal for the Lochaber aluminium plant, because the furnace requires so much power that the smelter is located near a hydroelectric plant, which drains the basin of the 114,000 acre Estate. Alcan designed all their smelters that way. The Estate includes the north face of Ben Nevis. According to reports, the Scottish Government mandated that the Estate never be split from the hydro plant and aluminium smelter, but Gupta ignored them and placed ownership of the Estate in a company that is domiciled on the Isle of Man. The 2016 deal was worth £330 million and was guaranteed by the UK Chancellor of the Exchequer. Conservative finance spokesperson Murdo Fraser was critical about the alleged breach of the Scottish Government agreement and urged the Scottish Government to "take whatever steps are necessary to protect public funds".

See also 

 Lochaber Narrow Gauge Railway for the construction and maintenance of the water-carrying tunnel
 Problem of water in vertical shafts, see item 5 at http://www.spanglefish.com/ooooppss/index.asp?pageid=608087

References

Hydroelectric power stations in Scotland
Buildings and structures in Highland (council area)
Lochaber